Głębock may refer to the following places in Poland:
Głębock, Lower Silesian Voivodeship (south-west Poland)
Głębock, Warmian-Masurian Voivodeship (north Poland)